Twitcher Rock is a rock in the southern part of Douglas Strait, 55 meters high and 140 to 150 meters in diameter, lying 0.7 nautical miles (1.3 km) east of Hewison Point, the southeast point of Thule Island in the South Sandwich Islands. Discovered by a Russian expedition under Fabian Gottlieb von Bellingshausen in 1820, it was charted in 1930 by DI personnel on the British ship Discovery II. They named it for John Montagu, 4th Earl of Sandwich, who was popularly known by the nickname Jemmy Twitcher.

References

Rock formations of South Georgia and the South Sandwich Islands